The following are lists of Indian state symbols as recognised by the state legislatures or by tradition.

 List of Indian state symbols
 List of Indian state flags
 List of Indian state emblems
 List of Indian state songs
 List of Indian state mottos
 List of Indian state foundation days
 List of Indian state animals
 List of Indian state birds
 List of Indian state flowers
 List of Indian state trees

See also
National symbols of India

References